John Sheepshanks   (b. Linton 5 May 1765 – d. St Gluvias 17 December 1844) was a nineteenth century Archdeacon of Cornwall.

Sheepshanks was educated at Trinity College, Cambridge and ordained in 1788. He served curacies in Ovington and Leeds, after which he was the incumbent at St Gluvias until his death.

References

Archdeacons of Cornwall
1844 deaths
1765 births
Clergy from Yorkshire
18th-century English Anglican priests
19th-century English Anglican priests
Alumni of Trinity College, Cambridge